Portencross is a hamlet near Farland Head in North Ayrshire, Scotland.

It has two harbours and a pier. The "Old Harbour" is actually a small tidal inlet next to the castle, and is part of the castle property.

The Portencross Pier was built in the era of Clyde steamer cruising but was never used as much as other locations such as Largs, Fairlie or Wemyss Bay.

Natural History
In 2014 the North Ayrshire Ranger Service carried out a survey of the plants growing on the rocky shore, whinstone dyke, saltmarsh and "machair-like" seaside vegetation. Species recorded included sea arrowgrass (Triglochin maritima); sea sandwort (Honkenya peploides); scurvy-grass (Cochlearia officinalis); common orache (Atriplex patula); sea club-rush (Scirpus maritimus); sea milkwort (Glaux maritima); salt mud-rush (Juncus gerardii); lesser sea spurrey (Spergularia marina); cliff sand spurrey (Spergularia rupicola); sea aster (Aster tripolium); red bartsia (Odonitites verna); silverweed (Potentilla anserina); bird's foot trefoil (Lotus geniculatus); sea pink/thrift (Armeria maritima); eyebright (Euphrasia nemorosa); yellow rattle (Rhinanthus minor); sea plantain (Plantago maritima); meadow cranesbill (Geranium pratense); purple loosetrife (Lythrum salicalia); pineapple weed (Matricaria matricariodes); curled dock (Rumex crispus); scentless mayweed (Matricaria maritima); corn sowthistle (Sonchus arvensis); marsh thistle (Cirsium palustre); lady's bedstraw (Galium verum); mugwort (Artemisia vulgaris); celery-leaved crowfoot (Ranunculus scleratus); ragged robin (Lychnis flos-cuculi); yellow flag iris (Iris pseudacorus); parsley water-dropwort (Oenanthe lachenalii); greater woodrush (Luzula sylvatica); amphibious bistort (Polygonum amphibian); crow garlic (Allium vineale var. compactum); Japanese rose (Rosa rugosa); alder (Alnus glutinosa); sea buckthorn (Hippophae rhamnoides); wood sage (Teucreum scorodonia); hemlock water-dropwort (Oenanthe crocata); sticky groundsel (Senecio viscosus); bloody cranesbill (Geranium sanguineum); bracken/brake (Pteridium aquilinium); yellow splash lichen (Xanthoria parietina); crab's eye lichen (Ochrolechia parella); sea ivory (Ramalina siliquosa).

Notes

See also
 Seamill
 West Kilbride
 Murder of Mary Speir Gunn

References

External links

 Portencross castle
 Portencross Jetty video
 YouTube video of Portencross, Castle, Harbours and Pier
 YouTube video of the Murder of Mary Gunn at Northbank Farm, Portencross
 The Portencross 'machair'
 YouTube aerial video using SNAPS of the Portencross machair and rocky shore

Ports and harbours of Scotland
Villages in North Ayrshire